Jordan Canal Park in Jordan, New York includes the Jordan Aqueduct, which carried the Erie Canal over Skaneateles Creek.

There is a pathway along the canal through the village.

References

Erie Canal parks, trails, and historic sites
Parks in Onondaga County, New York